La Mare is a small town in Réunion on the north coast.  It lies to the east of the capital St-Denis.

Transport

Rail 
La Mare used to be served by a station of the former railway system.

In 2009, it was proposed to rebuild a railway system to cope with growing population and traffic congestion, albeit in a hybrid tram-train form, namely the Réunion Tram Train.  La Mare is the northeastern terminus of the new network.

References 

Populated places in Réunion